Body and Soul is a studio album by jazz singer Billie Holiday, released in 1957.

Critical reception
In its 1957 review of the album, Saturday Review wrote: "With changes in her voice which bring Miss Holiday's singing closer to recitative has come an occasional timidity about altering a melody where before there was boldness. But she remains one of the best jazz singers, not only for her unique sound and attack, but for her straightforward, honest, musical communication."

Track listing
A side
"Body and Soul" (Johnny Green, Edward Heyman, Robert Sour, and Frank Eyton) – 6:18
"They Can't Take That Away From Me" (George and Ira Gershwin)  – 4:08
"Darn That Dream" (Jimmy Van Heusen and Eddie DeLange) – 6:15
"Let's Call The Whole Thing Off" (George and Ira Gershwin) – 3:22
B side
"Comes Love" (Sam H. Stept, Lew Brown and Charles Tobias) – 3:58
"Gee Baby, Ain't I Good to You" (Andy Razaf and Don Redman) – 5:34
"Embraceable You" (George and Ira Gershwin) – 6:45
"Moonlight in Vermont" (Karl Suessdorf and John Blackburn)- 3:47

bonus tracks on 2002 Verve Master Edition CD 
"Comes Love" (false start take 2) - 0:32
"Comes Love" (false start take 3) - 0:20
"Comes Love" (alternate take 1) - 3:56

Personnel
Billie Holiday – vocals
Ben Webster – Tenor Sax
Barney Kessel – Guitar
Harry "Sweets" Edison – Trumpet
Jimmy Rowles – Piano
Red Mitchell – Bass
Alvin Stoller – Drums on 1, 3, 5 and 8
Larry Bunker – Drums on 2, 4, 6 and 7

References

1956 albums
Billie Holiday albums
Clef Records albums
Verve Records albums
Albums produced by Norman Granz